Esther Morgan (born 28 August 2002) is a Welsh professional footballer who plays as a defender for Sunderland on loan from Tottenham Hotspur of the Women's Super League (FA WSL), and the Wales national team.

Club career 
At the age of 18, Morgan made her debut for Tottenham Hotspur on 28 February 2021. On 20 May 2021, in succession of both her club and international debuts, Morgan signed her first professional contract with Tottenham Hotspur; a one year deal with the option of a further year.

In February 2022, Morgan was loaned to fellow FA WSL club Leicester City until the end of the season.

On 13 September 2022, it was announced that Morgan would be joining Coventry United on a one year loan.

In January 2023, she joined Sunderland on loan.

International career
Morgan made her debut for the senior national team on 9 April 2021 during a friendly against Canada at age 18. She previously captained the under-19 team and played for numerous youth national teams.

References

External links
 
 

2002 births
Living people
Welsh women's footballers
Wales women's international footballers
Coventry United W.F.C. players
Leicester City W.F.C. players
Sunderland A.F.C. Ladies players
Tottenham Hotspur F.C. Women players
Women's association football defenders